Crelan–Euphony was a UCI Professional Continental cycling team based in Belgium that participated in UCI Continental Circuits races and when selected as a wildcard to UCI ProTour events. The team was managed by Gérard Bulens, with assistance from directeur sportifs Jef De Bilde, Claude Criquielion, Marco Saligari and Claude Van Collie.

Despite the fact that it was never a top team, they had a 3rd place in the GC of the 2003 Giro d'Italia, thanks to later Discovery Channel and Astana rider Yaroslav Popovych.

The team was sponsored by the Belgian companies Crelan, a bank, and Euphony, a telecommunications company.

The team folded at the end of the 2013 season, for financial reasons.

Final team roster

Major wins

1993
Stage 6a Herald Sun Tour, Jocelyn Jolidon
Stage 7 Herald Sun Tour, Jacques Jolidon
1994
Rund um Düren, Rik Claeys
1995
1996
Stage 3 Tour de Picardie, Marc Streel
Flèche Hesbignonne, Marc Streel
Stage 2 Circuit Franco-Belge, Marc Streel
Tour de Okinawa, Ken Hashikawa
1997
Grote Prijs Jef Scherens, Stéphane Hennebert
Stage 5 Rás Tailteann, Michael Fitzgerald
Zellik–Galmaarden, Ludo Dierckxsens
Grand Prix de Denain, Ludo Dierckxsens
1998
Stage 4 Vuelta a La Rioja, Jan Hordijk
Stage 5a Commonwealth Bank Classic, Jan Hordijk
Prix d'Armor, Hans De Meester
1999
Stage 1b OZ Wielerweekend, Bert Roesems
Stage 3a Circuit Franco-Belge, Bert Roesems
Overall Tour de la Somme, Bert Roesems
Stage 1b, Bert Roesems
Kampioenschap van Vlaanderen, Michel Van Haecke
2000
Cras Avernas, Michel Van Haecke
Stage 3a Tour de la Somme, Michel Van Haecke
Dwars door Gendringen, Kees Hopmans
Grote Prijs Stad Zottegem, Michel Van Haecke
Druivenkoers Overijse, Michel Van Haecke
2001
Nokere Koerse, Michel Van Haecke
Archer GP, Gordon McCauley
Antwerpse Havenpijl, Michel Van Haecke
GP Stadsbelangen Sint-Niklaas, Jurgen Vermeersch
Stage 2b Tour de la Somme, Bert Roesems
Stage 5 Tour de Wallonie, Bert Roesems
 New Zealand Road Race Championship, Gordon McCauley
2002
Gran Premio della Costa Etruschi, Yuri Metlushenko
Poreč Trophy I, Volodymyr Bileka
Poreč Trophy II, Yaroslav Popovych
GP de Genève, Yaroslav Popovych
Stage 4 Tour of South China Sea, Glen Chadwick
2003
GP d'Ouverture, Ludo Dierckxsens
Stage 3 Étoile de Bessèges, Tom Steels
Scheldeprijs Vlaanderen, Ludovic Capelle
Stage 1 Tour of Belgium, Tom Steels
Stage 7 Tour of Austria, Tom Steels
 Lithuania, Time Trial Championship, Tomas Vaitkus
Tour du Doubs, Bert De Waele
Stage 4 Regio Tour, Vladimir Duma
Stage 2 Danmark Rundt, Yuri Metlushenko
Stage 4 Danmark Rundt, Tomas Vaitkus
Stage 1 Tour du Poitou Charentes, Yuri Metlushenko
2004
Stage 1 Étoile de Bessèges, Tom Steels
Gran Premio della Costa Etruschi, Yuri Metlushenko
GP Cholet-Pays de Loire, Bert De Waele
Dwars door Vlaanderen, Ludovic Capelle
Grand Prix Pino Cerami, Nico Sijmens
Stage 2 Four Days of Dunkirk, Marc Streel
Overall Tour du Luxembourg, Maxime Monfort
Stage 2, Tom Steels
Stage 3, Maxime Monfort
Stage 1 & 3 Tour of Austria, Tom Steels
Stage 7 Tour of Austria, Ludo Dierckxsens
 Lithuania,  Road Race Championship, Tomas Vaitkus
 Lithuania, Time Trial Championship, Tomas Vaitkus
 Uzbekistan, Time Trial Championship, Sergey Lagutin
 Belgian, Road Race Championship, Tom Steels
Stage 2b Brixia Tour, Yuri Metlushenko
Stage 5 Danmark Rundt, Tomas Vaitkus
Stage 5 Tour du Poitou Charentes, Ludovic Capelle
Grand Prix d'Isbergues, Ludovic Capelle
Omloop van het Houtland, Bert De Waele
2005
Hel van het Mergelland, Nico Sijmens
Stage 3a Tour of Belgium, Jurgen Van Loocke
Flèche Hesbignonne, Geert Verheyen
 Uzbekistan, Time Trial Championship, Sergey Lagutin
 Uzbekistan, Road Race Championship, Sergey Lagutin
Overall Regio-Tour, Nico Sijmens
Stage 2, Nico Sijmens
Kampioenschap van Vlaanderen, Sergey Lagutin
2006
Stage 3, Nico Sijmens
2007
Beverbeek Classic, Nico Sijmens
Hel van het Mergelland, Nico Sijmens
Drie Zustersteden - Willebroek, Bert De Waele
Sparkassen Giro Bochum, Andy Cappelle
Stage 3 Regio Tour, Andy Cappelle
Stage 6 Tour of Britain, Paul Manning
Grand Prix de Wallonie, Bert De Waele
2008
Stage 1 Étoile de Bessèges, Jan Kuyckx
2009
1 Meiprijs, Denis Flahaut
Stage 4 Tour of Belgium, Bert De Waele
Nationale Sluitingsprijs, Denis Flahaut
2010
Dwars door het Hageland, Frédéric Amorison
2011
De Vlaamse Pijl, Frédéric Amorison
Omloop van het Waasland, Aidis Kruopis
Grand Prix Pino Cerami, Bert Scheirlinckx
1 Meiprijs, Aidis Kruopis
Stage 1 Tour de Picardie, Egidijus Juodvalkis
Stage 2 Tour of Belgium, Aidis Kruopis
I.W.T. Jong Maar Moedig, Bert Scheirlinckx
Stage 2 Paris–Corrèze, Bert De Waele
Schaal Sels, Aidis Kruopis
2012
, Time Trial Championship, Matti Helminen
De Vlaamse Pijl, Frédéric Amorison
Ronde van Limburg (Belgium), Kevin Claeys
Grote Prijs Jean-Pierre Monseré, Frédéric Amorison
Antwerpse Havenpijl, Joeri Stallaert
Kustpijl, Kevin Claeys
2013
Circuit de Wallonie, Sébastien Delfosse
Rund um Köln, Sébastien Delfosse
Kustpijl, Egidijus Juodvalkis
Stage 8 Tour of Taihu Lake, Jonathan Breyne

World and national champions

2001
 New Zealand Road Race Championship, Gordon McCauley
2003
 Lithuania Time Trial Championship, Tomas Vaitkus
2004
 Lithuania,  Road Race Championship, Tomas Vaitkus
 Lithuania, Time Trial Championship, Tomas Vaitkus
 Uzbekistan Time Trial Championship, Sergey Lagutin
 Belgian Road Race Championship, Tom Steels
2005
 Uzbekistan Time Trial Championship, Sergey Lagutin
 Uzbekistan Road Race Championship, Sergey Lagutin
2009
 Belgian Cyclo-cross Championship, Sven Nys
2010
 Belgian Cyclo-cross Championship, Sven Nys
2012
 Belgian Cyclo-cross Championship, Sven Nys
 Time Trial Championship, Matti Helminen
2013
 World Cyclo-cross Championship, Sven Nys

References

External links

 

Defunct cycling teams based in Belgium
Cycling teams based in Belgium
Cycling teams established in 1992
Cycling teams disestablished in 2013
Former UCI Professional Continental teams